Musa Daraq (also Romanized as Mūsá Daraq) is a village in Qareh Naz Rural District, in the Central District of Maragheh County, East Azerbaijan Province, Iran. At the 2006 census, its population was 707, in 157 families.

References 

Towns and villages in Maragheh County